Actinocephalus is a genus of plants in the Eriocaulaceae, first described in 2004. The entire genus is endemic to Brazil. It was formerly regarded as part of the related genus Paepalanthus, but recent studies have suggested that the two groups are better separated.

 Actinocephalus aggregatus F.N.Costa - Minas Gerais
 Actinocephalus bongardii (A.St.-Hil.) Sano - eastern + southern Brazil
 Actinocephalus brachypus (Bong.) Sano - Minas Gerais
 Actinocephalus cabralensis (Silveira) Sano - Minas Gerais
 Actinocephalus callophyllus (Silveira) Sano - Minas Gerais
 Actinocephalus ciliatus (Bong.) Sano - Minas Gerais, Rio de Janeiro
 Actinocephalus cipoensis (Silveira) Sano - Minas Gerais
 Actinocephalus claussenianus (Körn.) Sano - eastern + southern Brazil
 Actinocephalus compactus (Gardner) Sano - Minas Gerais
 Actinocephalus coutoensis (Moldenke) Sano - Minas Gerais
 Actinocephalus deflexus F.N.Costa - Minas Gerais
 Actinocephalus delicatus Sano - Minas Gerais
 Actinocephalus denudatus (Körn.) Sano - Minas Gerais
 Actinocephalus diffusus (Silveira) Sano - Minas Gerais
 Actinocephalus divaricatus (Bong.) Sano  - Minas Gerais
 Actinocephalus falcifolius (Körn.) Sano - Minas Gerais, Bahia
 Actinocephalus fimbriatus (Silveira) Sano - Minas Gerais
 Actinocephalus giuliettiae Sano - Minas Gerais
 Actinocephalus glabrescens (Silveira) Sano - Minas Gerais
 Actinocephalus graminifolius F.N.Costa - Minas Gerais
 Actinocephalus herzogii (Moldenke) Sano - Bahia
 Actinocephalus heterotrichus (Silveira) Sano - Minas Gerais
 Actinocephalus ithyphyllus (Mart.) Sano - Minas Gerais
 Actinocephalus koernickeanus Trovó & F.N.Costa - Minas Gerais
 Actinocephalus nodifer (Silveira) Sano - Minas Gerais
 Actinocephalus ochrocephalus (Körn.) Sano - Bahia
 Actinocephalus pachyphyllus (Körn.) F.N.Costa, Trovó & Echtern. - Minas Gerais
 Actinocephalus polyanthus (Bong.) Sano - eastern + southern Brazil
 Actinocephalus ramosus (Wikstr.) Sano - eastern Brazil
 Actinocephalus rigidus (Bong.) Sano - Minas Gerais
 Actinocephalus robustus (Silveira) Sano - Minas Gerais
 Actinocephalus stereophyllus (Ruhland) Sano - Minas Gerais
 Actinocephalus verae Sano & Trovó - Minas Gerais

References

Eriocaulaceae
Poales genera
Endemic flora of Brazil